Dweep is a puzzle game published in 1999 by Dexterity Software.

Gameplay
Dweep is a purple creature who must negotiate a series of dangerous obstacles to rescue defenseless baby Dweeps.

Obstacles include lasers, heat plates, bombs, and lots of other hazards.  Dweep must bypass these using only available non-violent tools such as mirrors, wrenches, and buckets of water. The non-violent, mentally challenging nature of the game was a deliberate design feature.

The game package contains 30 original game levels plus one secret bonus level. Dweep Gold also includes five free bonus levels and two expansion packs (20 levels each), as well as a number of custom levels.

Awards
 Dweep won the 2000 Shareware Industry Award.
 The expansion pack, Dweep Gold, won the 2001 Shareware Industry Award for Best Action/Arcade Game. (beating out Arkanoid for the honour)

Credit 
Dweep was created and programmed by Steve Pavlina, with music by Michael Huang.  Pavlina described the process he used to create the game in one of the posts on his blog, www.stevepavlina.com

References

External links
 Dweep Gold Version 1.40
 Dweep Gold Hints

1999 video games
Puzzle video games
Video games developed in the United States
Windows games
Windows-only games